The 1943 Antrim by-election was held on 11 February 1943.  The by-election was held due to the death of the incumbent UUP MP, Joseph McConnell.  It was won by the UUP candidate John Dermot Campbell.

Result

References

By-elections to the Parliament of the United Kingdom in County Antrim constituencies
1943 elections in the United Kingdom
20th century in County Antrim
February 1943 events
1943 elections in Northern Ireland